Universitas Pendidikan Ganesha (Undiksha) is a university that was developed based on Pancasila and Undang-undang Dasar 1945 that upholds human values, produces education personnel, and non-education personnel who are devoted to God Almighty, have high academic-professional abilities, develop science, technology, and art.

Undiksha has the motto "dharmaning sajjana umerdhyaken widyaguna" (the obligation of wise people is to develop knowledge and character). As one of the best educational campuses in Bali, Undiksha has several campus locations spread across two regencies. Each can be used as a place for lectures and practicums by study programs according to the provisions of the institution. The organization of educational services is carried out centrally through Undiksha Central Campus located in Singaraja City, Buleleng Regency, Bali.

Accreditation, Statistic, and Undiksha’s achievement 
Undiksha is acrredited A “Excellent” from Badan Akreditasi Nasional Perguruan Tinggi (BAN-PT). Undiksha also achieved the 11th Research and Innovation Ranking based on data released by Scimago Institutions Rankings (SIR).

Since the change of IKIP Negeri Singaraja to Universitas Pendidikan Ganesha (Undiksha) on May 11, 2006, Undiksha has managed to achieve various achievements. Various national and international achievements have been made by the entire academic community to achieve the vision and mission of the institution towards the Leading University in Asia.

Timelines 
Until now Undiksha has produced more than thirty-three thousand graduates who are mostly educators. Undiksha's history begins with the B-1 Course to provide Indonesian Language Teachers in 1955 and Commerce Teachers in 1957 for high school level. The brief history is as follows:

Faculty

Faculty of Languages and Arts 

 Education of Indonesian Language  (S-1)
 Education of English Language (S-1)
 Education of Fine Arts  (S-1)
 Education of English Language (S-1)
 Education of Balinese Language (S-1)
 English for Business and Professional Communication (D-4) (eks Diploma 3 in English Language (D-3))
 Diploma 3 in Visual Communication Design (D-3)

Faculty of Education 

 Study Program of Guidance and Counseling   (S-1)
 Study Program of Learning Technology (S-1)
 Study Program of Primary School Education Teachers (S-1)
 Study Program of Preschool Education Teachers (S-1)

Faculty of Law and Social Sciences 

 Education of Pancasila (Five Principles) and Civics (S-1)
 Geographical Education (S-1)
 Historical Education (S-1)
 Sociological Education (S-1)
 Legal Science (S-1)
 Diploma 3 in Library (D-3)
 Remote Sensing Engineering Technology (D-4) (eks Diploma 3 In Survey and Mapping (D-3))
 Geography (S-1)

Faculty of Mathematics and Natural Sciences 

 Education of Mathematics (S-1)
 Education of Physics (S-1)
 Biological Education (S-1)
 Education of Chemistry (S-1)
 Education of Natural Sciences (S-1)
 Applied Chemistry (D-4) (eks Diploma 3 in Chemical Analyst)
 Fisheries Biotechnology (D-4) (eks Diploma 3 in Marine Cultivation (D-3))
 Chemistry (S-1)
 Biology (S-1)
 Mathematics (S-1)
 Aquaculture (S-1)

Faculty of Sports and Health 

 Study Program of Physical, Health and Recreational Education (S-1)
 Study Program of Sports Education and Coaching (Strata 1 equivalent to BA degree) (S-1)
 Study Program of Sports Science (Strata 1 equivalent to BA degree)(S-1)
 Diploma III in Tourism Sports Training (D-3)

Engineering and Vocational Faculty 

 Education of Family Welfare (S-1)
 Education of Informatics Engineering (S-1)
 Education of Electrical Engineering(S-1)
 Software Engineering Technology  (D-4) (eks Informatics Management (D-3))
 Electronic Systems Engineering Technology (D-4) (eks Electronics Engineering  (D-3))
 Education of Mechanical Engineering (S-1)
 Educations of Culinary Arts Vocational (S-1)
 Informations System (S-1)
 Computer Science (S-1)

Faculty of Economics 

 Management (S-1)
 Accounting (S-1)
 Education of Economics (S-1)
 Pengelolaan Perhotelan (D-4) (eks Diploma in Hospitality)
 Akuntansi Sektor Publik (D-4) (eks D3 in Accounting)

Faculty of Medicine 
 Study Program of Medicine (S-1)
 Midwifery  (D-3)
 Midwifery (S-1)
 Nurse (S-1)
 Profesi Doktor
 Profesi NERS

Postgraduate Program  

 Master of Educational Administration
 Master of Accounting
 Master of Counseling Guidance
 Master of Computer Science
 Master of Management Science
 Master of Language Education
 Master of English Education
 Master of Elementary Education
 Master of Social Science Education
 Master of Sports Education
 Master of Educational Research and Evaluation
 Master of Learning Technology
 Doctor of Elementary Education
 Doctor of Education
 Doctor of Language Education

References 

 Situs resmi

Universities in Bali
Educational institutions established in 1993
Indonesian state universities
1993 establishments in Indonesia